Adam I. Lapidus is an American television writer, whose credits include Phil of the Future, Full House, Smart Guy, Jessie, Bunk'd, The Suite Life of Zack & Cody, The Suite Life on Deck and the season four Simpsons episode, "The Front". On the audio commentary, he commented that he uses the "I” when using his full name because he was trying to imitate James L. Brooks, another Simpsons writer whom Lapidus admired.

Writing credits

Bunk'd episodes
"Friending with the Enemy"
"For Love and Money"
"Xander Says Goodbye"
"Luke Out Below"
"Food Fight"

Jessie episodes
"Zombie Tea Party 5"
 "Take The A-Train I Think"
 "Evil Times Two"
 "Creepy Connie's Curtain Call"
 "Say Yes to the Messy Dress"
 "Jessie's Big Break"
 "Pain in the Rear Window"
 "Diary of a Mad Newswomen"
 "The Rosses Get Real"
 "Lights, Camera, Distraction!"
 "Spaced Out"
 "No Money, Mo' Problems"
 "Karate Kid-tastrophe"
 "Basket Cases"
 "Katch Kipling"

Phil of the Future episodes
"Future Jock"
"Daddie Dearest"

The Simpsons episodes
"The Front" (1993)

The Suite Life of Zack and Cody episodes
"Aptitude"
"Going for the Gold"
"Back in the Game"
"Graduation"
"Cookin' With Romeo and Juliet"
"The Prince and The Plunger"
"Crushed"
"Sleepover Suite"
"Volley Dad"
"Odd Couples"
"Not So Suite 16"
"Smart and Smarterer"

The Suite Life on Deck episodes
"Broke 'N' Yo-Yo"
"Sea Monster Mash"
"The Wrong Stuff"
"Smarticle Particles"
"Bon Voyage"
"Mean Chicks"

"Xiaolin Showdown" episode
"The Emperor Scorpion Strikes Back"

References

External links
 

American television producers
American television writers
American male television writers
Living people
Place of birth missing (living people)
Year of birth missing (living people)